Goodbye To The Age of Steam is the debut studio album by the English progressive rock band, Big Big Train. It was released in 1994, by Giant Electric Pea. On the official BBT website, Spawton has revealed that "much of the album was about how people lose their way in their lives; about the tightrope we all walk every day. The album title wasn't linked to this, but it conveyed a feeling of pathos which fitted the mood of the songs."

Re-release
The original album is out of print. In 2010 it was remastered by members of the band, and the track list has been expanded by three tracks: one being recorded for the 1993 demo The Infant Hercules, one newly recorded instrumental track from the 2010 line-up (including Nick D'Virgilio on drums and David Longdon on keyboards), and an expanded version of the original album track "Losing Your Way". The remastered version was released in 2011 with new artwork and liner notes.

Track listing

2011 bonus tracks
Far Distant Thing (Spawton) – 4:35 (1993 recording, originally released on The Infant Hercules)
Expecting Dragons (Spawton) – 7:16 (new recording)
Losing Your Way (Spawton) – 10:01 (extended version)

Personnel
Ian Cooper – keyboards
Steve Hughes – drums and percussion
Andy Poole – bass, additional keyboards
Martin Read – vocals
Greg Spawton – guitars, additional keyboards
David Longdon – keyboards on Expecting Dragons, 2011
Nick D'Virgilio – drums on Expecting Dragons, 2011

Guest musicians
Rob Aubrey – backing vocals
Ken Bundy – backing vocals
Gary Chandler – backing vocals
Sally French – backing vocals
Stuart Nicholson – backing vocals
Martin Orford – backing vocals
Mandy Taylor – backing vocals
Steve Christey – windchimes

External links

References 

1994 debut albums
Big Big Train albums